Greatest Hits is a compilation album by The Rabbis' Sons.  It contains six songs from Hal'lu, three songs from To Life, two songs from Shalom and one song from The Rabbis Sing.

Track listing

References
  The Rabbis’ Sons Greatest Hits at FAU Jewish Sound Archives

1977 greatest hits albums
Hasidic music
Jewish music albums